Eze Nri Fenenu was the eighth king of Nri Kingdom after succeeding Eze Nri Anyamata. He reigned from 1512–1582 CE.

References

Nri-Igbo
Nri monarchs
Kingdom of Nri
16th-century monarchs in Africa